The following musical events and releases are expected to happen in 2021 in Canada.

Events
 April 10 – 16th Canadian Folk Music Awards
 April 12 - CBC Music launches Canada Listens, a new musical version of the CBC's long-running literature debate show Canada Reads. Kardinal Offishall's album Quest for Fire: Firestarter, Vol. 1 is announced as the winner of the competition at the end of the week.
 June 6 – Juno Awards of 2021
 June 15 - Initial longlist for the 2021 Polaris Music Prize announced
 July 15 - Shortlist for the Polaris Music Prize announced
 July 26 - Prism Prize winners announced
 July 28 - SOCAN Songwriting Prize winners announced
 September 27 - Cadence Weapon wins the 2021 Polaris Music Prize for his album Parallel World
 November 7 - 43rd Félix Awards
 November 29 - 2021 Canadian Country Music Awards

Albums released

0-9
347aidan, Chasing Harmony

A
Afrikana Soul Sister, Kalasö
AHI, Prospect
Alee, Feels Like This - July 16
a l l i e, Tabula Rasa
Arkells, Blink Once - September 30
Tenille Arts, Girl to Girl - October 22

B
Backxwash, I Lie Here Buried with My Rings and My Dresses - May 28
BadBadNotGood, Talk Memory - October 8
James Baley, A Story
Ashleigh Ball, Before All the Magic's Gone
Gord Bamford, Diamonds in a Whiskey Glass - June 4
Barenaked Ladies, Detour de Force - July 16
The Beaches, Sisters Not Twins (The Professional Lovers Album)
Beatchild, Unselfish Desires - August 13
Bell Orchestre, House Music -  March 19
Belly, See You Next Wednesday - August 27
Beppie, Dino-Mite!
Art Bergmann, Late Stage Empire Dementia - May 21
Bernice, Eau de Bonjourno
The Besnard Lakes, The Besnard Lakes Are the Last of the Great Thunderstorm Warnings - January 29
Justin Bieber, Justice - March 19
Big Wreck, Big Wreck 7.1 - November 19
Blue Rodeo, Many a Mile - December 3
The Blue Stones, Hidden Gems - March 19
Born Ruffians, Pulp - April 16
Boslen, Dusk to Dawn
Boys Night Out, Nevermind 2 - July 16
Jon Bryant, Psychidyllic Salutations - November 26
Spencer Burton, Coyote

C
Cadence Weapon, Parallel World - April 30
Alessia Cara, In the Meantime - September 24
Casey MQ, babycasey: ultra
Charlotte Cardin, Phoenix - April 23
Casper Skulls, Knows No Kindness - November 12
Annabelle Chvostek, String of Pearls
Cœur de pirate, Perséides (April 30); Impossible à aimer (October 15)
Louis-Jean Cormier, Le ciel est au plancher - April 16
Charlotte Cornfield, Highs in the Minuses - October 29
Crown Lands, White Buffalo

D
Death From Above 1979, Is 4 Lovers - March 26
Art d'Ecco, In Standard Definition
The Deep Dark Woods, Changing Faces
The Dirty Nil, Fuck Art - January 1
Julie Doiron, I Thought of You - November 26
Drake, Certified Lover Boy - September 3
Drake, Scary Hours 2 - March 5
Kevin Drew, Influences - July 16
Dru, The Rebirth MMXX - May 27
Willie Dunn, Creation Never Sleeps, Creation Never Dies
Melanie Durrant, Where I'm At - May 7
Dvsn, Amusing Her Feelings - January 15
Dvsn and Ty Dolla Sign, Cheers to the Best Memories - August 20

E
Jade Eagleson, Honkytonk Revival - November 12
Efajemue, Aesthetics
Emanuel, Alt Therapy
André Ethier, Further Up Island

F
Michael Feuerstack, Harmonize The Moon - March 19
Dominique Fils-Aimé, Three Little Words - February 12
Jeremy Fisher, Hello Blue Monday
The Franklin Electric, This Time I See It - September 24

G
The Garrys, Get Thee to a Nunnery
Godspeed You! Black Emperor, G_d's Pee AT STATE'S END! - April 2
Great Aunt Ida, Unsayable - September 7
Great Lake Swimmers, Live at the Redeemer 2007 - May 14
Grievous Angels, Summer Before the StormG. R. Gritt, AncestorsH
Half Moon Run, Inwards & OnwardsHillsburn, Slipping AwayHunter Brothers, Been a Minute - June 30
Nate Husser, Adult SupervisionAndrew Hyatt, The Wanderspace Sessions (February); Wild Flowers (July)

I
Islands, Islomania - June 11

J
Jazz Cartier, The Fleur Print - September 10
Sean Jones, Weekend Lover - November 5

K
Greg Keelor, Share the LoveMo Kenney, Covers - February 26
Shawnee Kish, Shawnee Kish - June 25
Brett Kissel, What Is Life? - April 9
Kiwi Jr., Cooler Returns - January 22
Korea Town Acid, Metamorphosis (April); Cosmos (October)
Nicholas Krgovich, This SpringL
Land of Talk, Calming Night Partner - November 12
Daniel Lanois, Heavy Sun - March 19
Sook-Yin Lee and Adam Litovitz, Hubert Lenoir,  - September 15
Loony, Soft Thing; TurfLoscil, Clara - May 28
Russell Louder, HumorThe Lowest of the Low, Taverns and Palaces - December 10

M
Majid Jordan, Wildest Dreams - October 22
Manila Grey, No Saints on Knight StreetMartha and the Muffins, Marthology: In and Outtakes - November 5
Matt Mays, From Burnside with LoveKairo McLean, Easy NowKelly McMichael, WavesMyst Milano, ShapeshyfterMillimetrik, Sun-DrenchedAriane Moffatt, Incarnat - March 25
Monowhales, Daytona BleachJess Moskaluke, The Demos - February 19
Mother Mother, Inside - June 25
Mouth Congress, Waiting for Henry - December 10
Mustafa, When Smoke Rises - May 28

N
Nimkii and the Niniis, Nang GiizhigoongLaura Niquay, Waska MatisiwinSafia Nolin, SeumJustin Nozuka, Then, Now & Again - April 9

O
Ocie Elliott, Slow TideOdonis Odonis, SpectrumsSteven Lee Olsen, Relationship Goals - July 30
The Oot n' Oots, Ponderosa Bunchgrass and the Golden RuleOuri, Frame of a FaunaP
Dorothea Paas, Anything Can't Happen - May 7
Meghan Patrick, Heart on My Glass - June 25
Dany Placard, Astronomie (suite)The Joel Plaskett Emergency, Twenty Years Gone: The Joel Plaskett Emergency Revisits Down at the KhyberPlaza, Nocturnes - October 1
Postdata, Twin Flames - March 5
Garth Prince, Falling in AfricaPriyanka, Taste Test - July 16

R
Raised By Swans, Raised By Swans Is the Name of a Man, Volume 1 - February 9
Rare Americans, Rare Americans 2 (March); Jamesy Boy & The Screw Loose Zoo (November)
Rhye, Home - January 22
Daniel Romano, Cobra PoemsDaniel Romano, Fully Plugged InDaniel Romano, Kissing the FoeRoyal Canoe, Sidelining - July 9
Justin Rutledge, Islands - March 26
Ruth B., Moments In Between - June 11
Serena Ryder, The Art of Falling Apart - March 12

S
Julien Sagot, SagotSaid the Whale, Dandelion - October 22
SATE, The FoolJP Saxe, Dangerous Levels Of Introspection - June 25
Jay Scøtt, Ses plus grands succèsJoseph Shabason, The Fellowship - April 30
Shad, TAO - October 1
Andy Shauf, WildsTyler Shaw, Tyler Shaw - August 20
Leanne Betasamosake Simpson, Theory of IceSmall Sins, Volume II - February 12
Snotty Nose Rez Kids, Life AfterSpiritbox, Eternal Blue - September 17
Status/Non-Status, 1 2 3 4 500 YearsEmily Steinwall, Welcome to the GardenStripper's Union, The UndertakingAdrian Sutherland, When the Magic HitsSuuns, The WitnessT
Talk, Talk to MeTebey, The Good Ones - January 22
TEKE::TEKE, ShirushiTiKA, Anywhere But HereTommy Lefroy, Flight RiskMorgan Toney, First FlightThe Tragically Hip, Saskadelphia (EP) - May 21
The Tragically Hip, Road Apples: 30th Anniversary Edition - October 15
The Trews, Wanderer - November 19
TUNS, Duly Noted - March 26

U
Ubiquitous Synergy Seeker, Einsteins of Consciousness - January 8
Suzie Ungerleider, My Name Is Suzie Ungerleider - August 13

V
Mathew V, The Outer CircleVincent Vallières, Toute beauté n'est pas perdueChad VanGaalen, World's Most Stressed Out Gardener — March 19
Jon Vinyl, Lost in YouW
Martha Wainwright, Love Will Be Reborn - August 20
The Weather Station, Ignorance - February 5
Whitehorse, Modern LoveWhitehorse, Strike Me DownThe Wilderness of Manitoba, Farewell to Cathedral - October 29
Charlotte Day Wilson, Alpha'' - July 9

Deaths
January 12 - Curtis "Shingoose" Jonnie, singer-songwriter (COVID-19)
January 28 - Jay W. McGee, R&B, soul and hip hop musician ("Ladies Delight", "Another Love in Your Life")
April 4 - Paul Humphrey, lead singer for Blue Peter (multiple system atrophy)
April 14 - Michel Louvain, singer (cancer)
April 19 - Bob Lanois, record producer and recording engineer
June 23 - Ellen McIlwaine, blues singer
December 18 - Custom, filmmaker and musician (cardiac arrest)

References